= Charles of Scotland =

Charles of Scotland may refer to:

- Charles I of Scotland (1600–1649), King of England, Scotland, and Ireland
- Charles II of Scotland (1630–1685), King of England, Scotland, and Ireland
- Charles Edward Stuart (1720–1788), Stuart claimant to the thrones of England, Scotland and Ireland
